Oswald Vernon Evans (2 September 1916 – May 1986) was a Welsh footballer who made one appearance in the Football League for Fulham as a goalkeeper. While a Fulham player, he "reputedly weighed over 20 stone".

Career statistics

Honours 
Ashford Town

 Kent League: 1949–50

References

1916 births
1986 deaths
Association football goalkeepers
Date of death missing
English Football League players
Footballers from Llanelli
Fulham F.C. players
Welsh footballers
Ashford United F.C. players
Kent Football League (1894–1959) players